John Burns Brooksby  (25 December 1914 – 17 December 1998) was a Scottish veterinarian, animal physiologist and veterinary virologist. He was a recognised expert on serology and especially foot-and-mouth disease, and identified and categorised the majority of its known forms. His advice was taken on an international level, and he played a significant role in disease control in Africa and the Middle East.

He was responsible for the control of the spread of this disease at international level.

Education and career
Brooksby attended Hyndland Secondary School in Glasgow and then the Glasgow Veterinary College. He then completed a BSc in Veterinary Science at London University while lecturing in histology at the College.

In 1936 he decided on a career in animal physiology and received a grant to study for three years. He studied at three separate centres of excellence on consecutive years: University College, London; McGill University in Montreal in Canada; and the University of Edinburgh under Professor Francis Albert Eley Crew. However, once complete in 1939, his preferred field of animal reproduction offered no employment opportunities and instead he joined the Foot-and-Mouth Research Institute at Pirbright.

He developed a methodology for diagnosing and typing foot-and-mouth disease which was thereafter adopted worldwide. Following a widespread epidemic in Mexico he developed an effective vaccination against the disease. His studies included the survival of the virus in meat, concluding that the virus made use of the animal meat non-viable, a major contributor to the widespread fear of the disease now felt in the farming community.

Brooksby became Deputy Director of the Pirbright Institute in 1957, and took complete control as Director in 1964. He served as Director for 16 years. During this time he worked particularly on vaccines and further study on the potential for airborne spread of the disease. His research also extended into African swine fever and blue tongue viruses. He prepared the UK for an epidemic of swine vesicular disease, stemming from Italy and Hong Kong and halted it in its tracks in 1972 due to appropriate immunisation.

He was elected a 17n17 in 1968 and a Fellow of the Royal Society in 1970.

In 1973 he was made a Commander of the Order of the British Empire.

Personal life
He was born on 25 December 1914 to Elizabeth Brodie Burns and George B. Brooksby, an organ-builder in Hyndland, Glasgow. His mother was from a family of Renfrewshire farmers and he visited his uncles' farms who engendered in him, a love of animals.

Brooksby married Muriel Weir, one of his Glasgow students, on 18 December 1940. They had two children, Elspeth and Iain.

He had developed a keen love of art from his mother and was a member of the Farnham Art Society, selling several pictures. On retiring he moved to Cambridgeshire with his wife. Here he joined a painting class in Grantchester and exhibited there. He was also a keen golfer and gardener.

Brooksby died on 17 December 1998 at Swaffham Bulbeck near Cambridge aged 83 years.

Publications

References

British veterinarians
1914 births
1998 deaths
People in health professions from Glasgow
Commanders of the Order of the British Empire
Fellows of the Royal Society
Fellows of the Royal Society of Edinburgh